Roy Assaf may refer to:

 Roy Assaf (actor) (born 1979), Israeli actor
 Roy Assaf (choreographer) (born 1982), Israeli dancer and choreographer
 Roy Assaf (musician) (born 1982), Israeli musician